Pakistani Pomade is an album by German free jazz pianist Alexander von Schlippenbach's Trio, featuring saxophonist Evan Parker and percussionist Paul Lovens, recorded in Germany in 1972 for the FMP label.

Reception

The Allmusic review by  Thom Jurek awarded the album 4½ stars stating "This truly inspiring music was made by a band who had yet to see how much taste, grace, and elegance they possessed. Pakistani is essential listening for vanguard jazz fans".

The Penguin Guide to Jazz awarded the album a "Crown" signifying a recording that the authors "feel a special admiration or affection for".

All About Jazz stated "The group carries a stalwart emphasis on color, texture, and density—of both the timbral and harmonic kind... European improv never sounded better"

Track listing
All compositions by Alexander von Schlippenbach, Evan Parker & Paul Lovens
 "Sun-Luck Night-Rain" - 5:22    
 "Butaki Sisters" - 9:07
 "A Little Yellow (Including Two Seconds Monk)" - 7:09
 "Ein Husten für Karl Valentin" - 3:22
 "Pakistani Pomade" - 6:02
 "Von "G" AB 403-418" - 0:52
 "Moonbeef" - 10:05
 "Kleine Nülle, Evergreen" - 0:49    
 "Pakistani Alternate #1" - 11:35 Bonus track on CD reissue
 "Pakistani Alternate #2" - 0:52 Bonus track on CD reissue    
 "Pakistani Alternate #3" - 7:00 Bonus track on CD reissue    
 "Pakistani Alternate #4" - 4:01 Bonus track on CD reissue

Personnel
Alexander von Schlippenbach - piano
Evan Parker - soprano saxophone, tenor saxophone
Paul Lovens - drums

References

1973 albums
Alexander von Schlippenbach albums
FMP/Free Music Production albums